Dawan is a Somaliland Somali-language newspaper. It is published in Hargeisa, and it was started in 2000. 
The newspaper is owned by Dawan Media Group which a is department of Ministry of Information and National Guidance of Somaliland, It works as the principal newspaper of the government of Somaliland.

See also

 List of newspapers in Somaliland
 Telecommunications in Somaliland
 Media of Somaliland

References

External links
Dawan Newspaper

2000 establishments in Somaliland
African news websites
Somali-language newspapers
Newspapers published in Somaliland
Daily newspapers published in Somaliland
Newspapers established in 2000
Newspapers published in Hargeisa